Parkrose High School is a public high school in Portland, Oregon, United States. It is the only high school in the Parkrose School District.

Academics
In 2008, 72% of the school's seniors received a high school diploma. Of 231 students, 167 graduated, 27 dropped out, ten received a modified diploma, and 27 were still in high school the following year. These numbers have gotten slightly better (and higher than the state average), with, in 2014, a 78% on-time graduation rate for seniors and 34 dropping out.

Athletics

The Parkrose High School dance team, the Elite, placed first in the show division of the OSAA State Championships in 1996, 2001, 2010, 2011, and 2014. Parkrose High School. The boy's water polo team won state in the 2018–19 school year.

Boys' Basketball Program
The men's basketball team has been one of the most successful programs in Oregon. Parkrose has produced 10 plus D1 basketball recruits in program history. Some previous Bronco players have chosen to play at Kentucky, Syracuse, Oregon State, Oregon, Washington State, New Mexico State, and other schools. Parkrose has won state titles in 1964, 1978, and 1982. Donell Morgan has been head coach since 2017.

Notable Events 
On May 17, 2019, 18 year old Angel Granados Dias entered his Parkrose High School classroom wearing a black trench coat and carrying a loaded shotgun while suffering from a mental health crisis.  He was subdued by the school's security guard and sports coach, former Oregon Ducks football team star wide receiver Keanon Lowe. Lowe had previously been searching for Dias after the school received information on a possible threat. It was discovered that the shotgun was only loaded with one round on which Dias had written "5-17-19 just for me" and that Dias was going to attempt suicide. He was also carrying a suicide note with cremation costs and instructions for his body. On October 10, 2019, after five months in jail, Dias pleaded guilty to felony possession of a firearm in a public building and misdemeanor possession of a loaded firearm in public and was sentenced to three years of probation and any necessary mental health treatment.

In August 2019, it was reported that the school's administration and police had repeatedly harassed an autistic teenager, named only as Sanders, his middle name, for months over fears that he was planning a school shooting. Fears were raised after a librarian reported that they had overheard students discussing the recent nationwide school shootings and referred to another student by a nickname "Shooter." The administration falsely identified "Shooter" as Sanders and raised caution over the fact that he was reportedly fascinated by guns, wore a trench coat, and was found with sharpened scissors.

Notable alumni

 Ray Blume (born 1958) - All-American collegiate and pro basketball player
Isaac Bonton – college basketball player 
 Anna Song Canzano – television reporter and anchor
 LeRon Ellis (born 1969) – pro basketball player
 Michael Allen Harrison – musician
 Susan Helms (born 1958) - astronaut
 Eddie Kunz (born 1986) – pro baseball player
 Brian Lindstrom (born 1961) – filmmaker
 Larry Harvey - Burning Man founder
 Jim Pepper - Jazz saxophonist, composer and singer

References

External links

High schools in Portland, Oregon
Public high schools in Oregon
1913 establishments in Oregon
Parkrose, Portland, Oregon